The 2012 Knoxville Challenger was a professional tennis tournament played on hard courts. It was the ninth edition of the tournament which was part of the 2012 ATP Challenger Tour. It took place in Knoxville, United States between 5 and 11 November 2012.

Singles main-draw entrants

Seeds

 1 Rankings are as of October 29, 2012.

Other entrants
The following players received wildcards into the singles main draw:
  Jarryd Chaplin
  Brandon Ficky
  Christian Harrison
  Eric Quigley

The following players received entry from the qualifying draw:
  Devin Britton
  Luka Gregorc
  Daniel King-Turner
  Austin Krajicek

Champions

Singles

 Michael Russell def.  Bobby Reynolds, 6–3, 6–2

Doubles

 Alex Kuznetsov /  Mischa Zverev def.  Jean Andersen /  Izak van der Merwe, 6–4, 6–2

External links
Official Website

Knoxville Challenger
Knoxville Challenger
2012 in American tennis
2012 in sports in Tennessee